Chryse , also called Lemnian Chryse, was a small island in the Aegean Sea near Lemnos, mentioned by Homer and Sophocles. By the second century, Pausanias and Appian say that it had sunk below the sea. Its location is unknown.

The island's main feature was said to be its temple to Apollo, and its patron deity was the goddess Chryse. The Greek archer Philoctetes stopped there on his way to Troy and was bitten by a viper. Lucullus captured three men there in an ambush during the Third Mithridatic War. The island seems to have disappeared by the second century AD. An ancient oracle (written by Onomacritus) may have predicted this end.

The Description of Greece says:

Proposed sites

White building blocks (presumably from Apollo's temple) were said to be visible on the sea floor. The Kharos Bank is mentioned by others as a possible site, but there does not appear to have been further work on it.

Another theory proposes that the remains of Chryse are on a small islet only 70–80 m off the north coast of Lemnos, locally known as Varvara. Though the islet has a "heavy concentration of ancient foundations and fragments of pottery", and a large mound at its summit surrounded by walls (possibly an altar), it has not been excavated. It was apparently larger in antiquity, and large parts have sunk because of tectonic activity.

References

Further reading
 Edna M. Hooker, "The Sanctuary and Altar of Chryse in Attic Red-Figure Vase-Paintings of the Late Fifth and Early Fourth Centuries B.C.", The Journal of Hellenic Studies. 70: 35–41  (1950)

External links
 "Herakles sacrifies to Chryse", vase painting with altar of Chryse, Vienna Art Museum

Islands of Greece
North Aegean islands
Former islands
Ancient Aegean Sea
Ancient Lemnos
Mythological islands
Former populated places in Greece